Pimpleia (Ancient Greek: Πίμπλεια) was a city in Pieria in Ancient Greece, located near Dion and ancient Leivithra at Mount Olympus. Pimpleia is described as a "κώμη" ("quarter, suburb") of Dion by Strabo. The location of Pimpleia is possibly to be identified with the modern village of Agia Paraskevi near Litochoron.

It was renowned as the birthplace and early abode of Orpheus. Many springs and memorials dedicated to Orpheus and Orphic cults. Cults of the Muses were also celebrated, under the epithet Pimpleids (Πιμπληίδες).

References

External links
 Greek Mythology Link, Orpheus

Populated places in ancient Macedonia
Former populated places in Greece
Geography of ancient Pieria
Geography of ancient Thessaly
Locations in Greek mythology
Museology
Pierian mythology
Orpheus